Peyton Field at Baker Stadium is a 3,500-seat outdoor multi-purpose stadium in the northwest United States, located on the campus of the University of Puget Sound in the north end of Tacoma, Washington.

Built  in 1964 with a grant from prominent Tacoma businessman John S. Baker, it is home to UPS Logger football, soccer, track and field, cross country, and lacrosse. The field is named after former Puget Sound alumni Joe Peyton, who was a long-time coach and faculty member.

The stadium has covered seating of 3,000 and uncovered seating of 500.

References

College football venues
Soccer venues in Washington (state)
1964 establishments in Washington (state)
Sports venues completed in 1964
Sports venues in Tacoma, Washington
American football venues in Washington (state)
College soccer venues in the United States
College track and field venues in the United States
College lacrosse venues in the United States
Puget Sound Loggers football